Božo Starčević (born 11 December 1988 in Zagreb) is a male Greco-Roman wrestler from Croatia.

His best achievement is the bronze medal at the 2013 European Wrestling Championships – Men's Greco-Roman 74 kg in Tbilisi, Georgia.

Early life
Already at the young age, everybody noticed his talent and spirit for sport activities. Before he started wrestling at age 10, he had been training gymnastics. He started training wrestling at wrestling club "Metalac" in Zagreb. His first coach was Mario Baić.

In 1999, just after one week of training, he won his first gold medal in wrestling, in category to 29 kg. It was international boys tournament in Slovenia.

Career
Božo, at age 18, competed in the 2007 World Junior Championship in Beijing. He finished at 5th place in 60 kg category.

In 2008 European Junior Championship in Slovakia, he was 5th again in 66 kg category.

Shortly after changing his weight category (74 kg) and entering in seniors, he managed to win Croatian national championship in 2009, 2010 and 2011.

In 2010, he was finally invited to his first senior 2010 European Wrestling Championships in Baku, Azerbaijan. He ended on 8th place with 2 wins and 2 defeats.

In 2012, he got invitation for 2012 European Wrestling Championships in Belgrade, and he repeated his result from 2010, ending on 8th place.

In 2013 he won bronze medal at the 2013 European Wrestling Championships – Men's Greco-Roman 74 kg in Tbilisi, Georgia.

In March 2021, he qualified at the European Qualification Tournament to compete at the 2020 Summer Olympics in Tokyo, Japan.

He is a member of wrestling club "Metalac" from Zagreb. His coach is his brother - Nikola Starčević.

References

External links

 Profile on International Wrestling Database
 Official web site

Living people
1988 births
Croatian male sport wrestlers
Wrestlers at the 2015 European Games
European Games competitors for Croatia
Wrestlers at the 2016 Summer Olympics
Olympic wrestlers of Croatia
Mediterranean Games bronze medalists for Croatia
Mediterranean Games medalists in wrestling
Competitors at the 2018 Mediterranean Games
Wrestlers at the 2019 European Games
Wrestlers at the 2020 Summer Olympics
20th-century Croatian people
21st-century Croatian people